Draba brachycarpa, common name, shortpod draba, is a North American species of flowering plant in the family Brassicaceae. The species name brachycarpa means "bearing short fruits."

Distribution 
USA: AL , AR , AZ , FL , GA , IL , IN , KS , KY , LA , MO , MS , MT , NC , OH , OK , OR , SC , TN , TX , VA

Habitat 
Cedar glades, open fields, limestone rubble, dry to moist open soil, and waste ground.

References

brachycarpa